Albania (or ), officially the Republic of Albania, is a country in Southeastern Europe. It is situated in the Balkans, and is located on the Adriatic and Ionian Seas within the Mediterranean Sea and shares land borders with Montenegro to the northwest, Kosovo to the northeast, North Macedonia to the east, and Greece to the south. The landscape ranges from the snow-capped mountains in the Albanian Alps and the Korab, Skanderbeg, Pindus, and Ceraunian Mountains, to the hot and sunny coasts of the Adriatic and Ionian Seas along the Mediterranean. Tirana is its capital and largest city, followed by Durrës, Vlorë, and Shkodër.

Albania has been inhabited by different civilisations over time, such as the Illyrians, Thracians, Ancient Greeks, Romans, Byzantines, Venetians, and Ottomans. The Albanians established the autonomous Principality of Arbër in the 12th century. The Kingdom of Albania and Principality of Albania formed between the 13th and 14th centuries. Prior to the Ottoman conquest of Albania in the 15th century, the Albanian resistance to Ottoman expansion into Europe led by Skanderbeg won them acclaim over most of Europe. Albania remained under Ottoman rule for nearly five centuries, during which many Albanians (known as Arnauts) attained high-ranking offices in the empire, especially in the Southern Balkans and Egypt. Between the 18th and 19th centuries, cultural developments, widely attributed to Albanians having gathered both spiritual and intellectual strength, conclusively led to the Albanian Renaissance. After the defeat of the Ottomans in the Balkan Wars, the modern nation state of Albania declared independence in 1912. In the 20th century, the Kingdom of Albania was invaded by Italy, which formed Greater Albania before becoming a protectorate of Nazi Germany. Enver Hoxha formed the People's Socialist Republic of Albania after World War II, modeled under the terms of Hoxhaism. The Revolutions of 1991 concluded the fall of communism in Albania and eventually the establishment of the current Republic of Albania.

Albania is a unitary parliamentary constitutional republic. It is a developing country, ranking 67th in the Human Development Index, with an upper-middle income economy dominated by the service sector, followed by manufacturing. It went through a process of transition following the end of communism in 1990, from centralised planning to a market-based economy. Albania provides universal health care and free primary and secondary education to its citizens. Albania is a member of the United Nations, World Bank, UNESCO, NATO, WTO, COE, OSCE, and OIC. It has been an official candidate for membership in the European Union since 2014. It is one of the founding members of the Energy Community, including the Organization of the Black Sea Economic Cooperation and Union for the Mediterranean.

Name 

The term Albania is the medieval Latin name of the country. It may be derived from the Illyrian tribe of Albani recorded by Ptolemy, the geographer and astronomer from Alexandria, who drafted a map in 150 AD which shows the city of Albanopolis located northeast of Durrës. The term may have a continuation in the name of a medieval settlement called Albanon or Arbanon, although it is not certain that this was the same place. In his history written in the 10th century, the Byzantine historian Michael Attaliates was the first to refer to Albanoi as having taken part in a revolt against Constantinople in 1043 and to the Arbanitai as subjects of the Duke of Dyrrachium.

Nowadays, Albanians call their country . The words Shqipëri and Shqiptar are attested from 14th century onwards, but it was only at the end of 17th and beginning of the early 18th centuries that the placename Shqipëria and the ethnic demonym Shqiptarë gradually replaced Arbëria and Arbëreshë amongst Albanian speakers. The two terms are popularly interpreted as "Land of the Eagles" and "Children of the Eagles".

History

Prehistory 

The first attested traces of Neanderthal presence in the territory of Albania dates back to the middle and upper Paleolithic period and were discovered in Xarrë and at Mount Dajt in the adjacent region of Tirana. Archaeological sites from this period include the Kamenica Tumulus, Konispol Cave and Pellumbas Cave.

The discovered objects in a cave near Xarrë include flint and jasper objects along with fossilised animal bones, while those discoveries at Mount Dajt comprise bone and stone tools similar to those of the Aurignacian culture. They also demonstrate notable similarities with objects of the equivalent period found at Crvena Stijena in Montenegro and northwestern Greece.

Multiple artefacts from the Iron and Bronze Ages near tumulus burials have been unearthed in central and southern Albania, which has similar affinity with the sites in southwestern Macedonia and Lefkada. Archaeologists have come to the conclusion that these regions were inhabited from the middle of the third millennium BC by Indo-European people who spoke a Proto-Greek language. Hence, a part of this historical population later moved to Mycenae around 1600 BC and properly established the Mycenaean civilisation.

Antiquity 

In ancient times, the incorporated territory of Albania was historically inhabited by Indo-European peoples, among them numerous Illyrian tribes, Ancient Greeks and Thracians. In view of the Illyrian tribes, there is no evidence that these tribes used any collective nomenclature for themselves, while it is regarded to be unlikely that they used a common endonym. The endonym Illyrians seems to be the name applied to a specific Illyrian tribe, which was the first to come in liaison with the Ancient Greeks resulting in the endonym Illyrians to be applied pars pro toto to all people of similar language and customs.

The territory referred to as Illyria corresponded roughly to the area east of the Adriatic Sea in the Mediterranean Sea extending in the south to the mouth of the Vjosë. The first account of the Illyrian groups comes from Periplus of the Euxine Sea, an ancient Greek text written in the middle of the 4th century BC. The west was inhabited by the Thracian tribe of the Bryges while the south was inhabited by the Ancient Greek-speaking tribe of the Chaonians, whose capital was at Phoenice. Other colonies such as Apollonia, Epidamnos, and Amantia, were established by Ancient Greek city-states on the coast by the 7th century BC.

The Illyrian Ardiaei tribe, centred in Montenegro, ruled over most of the territory of Albania. Their Ardiaean Kingdom reached its greatest extent under King Agron, the son of Pleuratus II. Agron extended his rule over other neighbouring tribes as well. Following Agron's death in 230 BC, his wife, Teuta, inherited the Ardiaean kingdom. Teuta's forces extended their operations further southwards to the Ionian Sea. In 229 BC, Rome declared war on the kingdom for extensively plundering Roman ships. The war ended in Illyrian defeat in 227 BC. Teuta was eventually succeeded by Gentius in 181 BC. Gentius clashed with the Romans in 168 BC, initiating the Third Illyrian War. The conflict resulted in Roman conquest of the region by 167 BC. The Romans split the region into three administrative divisions.

Middle Ages 

The Roman Empire was split in 395 upon the death of Theodosius I into an Eastern and Western Roman Empire in part because of the increasing pressure from threats during the Barbarian Invasions. From the 6th century into the 7th century, the Slavs crossed the Danube and largely absorbed the indigenous Ancient Greeks, Illyrians and Thracians in the Balkans; thus, the Illyrians were mentioned for the last time in historical records in the 7th century.

In the 11th century, the Great Schism formalised the break of communion between the Eastern Orthodox and Western Catholic Church that is reflected in Albania through the emergence of a Catholic north and Orthodox south. The Albanian people inhabited the west of Lake Ochrida and the upper valley of River Shkumbin and established the Principality of Arbanon in 1190 under the leadership of Progon of Kruja. The realm was succeeded by his sons Gjin and Dhimitri.

Upon the death of Dhimiter, the territory came under the rule of the Albanian-Greek Gregory Kamonas and subsequently under the Golem of Kruja. In the 13th century, the principality was dissolved. Arbanon is considered to be the first sketch of an Albanian state, that retained a semi-autonomous status as the western extremity of the Byzantine Empire, under the Byzantine Doukai of Epirus or Laskarids of Nicaea.

Towards the end of the 12th and beginning of the 13th centuries, Serbs and Venetians started to take possession over the territory. The ethnogenesis of the Albanians is uncertain; however the first undisputed mention of Albanians dates back in historical records from 1079 or 1080 in a work by Michael Attaliates, who referred to the Albanoi as having taken part in a revolt against Constantinople. At this point the Albanians were fully Christianised.

Few years after the dissolution of Arbanon, Charles of Anjou concluded an agreement with the Albanian rulers, promising to protect them and their ancient liberties. In 1272, he established the Kingdom of Albania and conquered regions back from the Despotate of Epirus. The kingdom claimed all of central Albania territory from Dyrrhachium along the Adriatic Sea coast down to Butrint. A catholic political structure was a basis for the papal plans of spreading Catholicism in the Balkan Peninsula. This plan found also the support of Helen of Anjou, a cousin of Charles of Anjou. Around 30 Catholic churches and monasteries were built during her rule mainly in northern Albania. Internal power struggles within the Byzantine Empire in the 14th century enabled Serbs' most powerful medieval ruler, Stefan Dusan, to establish a short-lived empire that included all of Albania except Durrës. In 1367, various Albanian rulers established the Despotate of Arta. During that time, several Albanian principalities were created, notably the Principality of Albania, Principality of Kastrioti, Lordship of Berat and Principality of Dukagjini. In the first half of the 15th century, the Ottoman Empire invaded most of Albania, and the League of Lezhë was held under Skanderbeg as a ruler, who became the national hero of the Albanian medieval history.

Ottoman Empire 

With the fall of Constantinople, the Ottoman Empire continued an extended period of conquest and expansion with its borders going deep into Southeast Europe. They reached the Albanian Ionian Sea Coast in 1385 and erected their garrisons across Southern Albania in 1415 and then occupied most of Albania in 1431. Thousands of Albanians consequently fled to Western Europe, particularly to Calabria, Naples, Ragusa and Sicily, whereby others sought protection at the often inaccessible Mountains of Albania.

The Albanians, as Christians, were considered an inferior class of people, and as such they were subjected to heavy taxes among others by the Devshirme system that allowed the Sultan to collect a requisite percentage of Christian adolescents from their families to compose the Janissary. The Ottoman conquest was also accompanied with the gradual process of Islamisation and the rapid construction of mosques which consequently modified the religious picture of Albania.

A prosperous and longstanding revolution erupted after the formation of the Assembly of Lezhë until the Siege of Shkodër under the leadership of Gjergj Kastrioti Skanderbeg, multiple times defeating major Ottoman armies led by Sultans Murad II and Mehmed II. Skanderbeg managed to gather several of the Albanian principals, amongst them the Arianitis, Dukagjinis, Zaharias and Thopias, and establish a centralised authority over most of the non-conquered territories, becoming the Lord of Albania.

Skanderbeg consistently pursued the goal relentlessly but rather unsuccessfully to constitute a European coalition against the Ottomans. He thwarted every attempt by the Ottomans to regain Albania, which they envisioned as a springboard for the invasion of Italy and Western Europe. His unequal fight against them won the esteem of Europe also among others financial and military aid from the Papacy and Naples, Venice and Ragusa.

When the Ottomans were gaining a firm foothold in the region, Albanian towns were organised into four principal sanjaks. The government fostered trade by settling a sizeable Jewish colony of refugees fleeing persecution in Spain. The city of Vlorë saw passing through its ports imported merchandise from Europe such as velvets, cotton goods, mohairs, carpets, spices and leather from Bursa and Constantinople. Some citizens of Vlorë even had business associates throughout Europe.

The phenomenon of Islamisation among the Albanians became primarily widespread from the 17th century and continued into the 18th century. Islam offered them equal opportunities and advancement within the Ottoman Empire. However, motives for conversion were, according to some scholars, diverse depending on the context though the lack of source material does not help when investigating such issues. Because of increasing suppression of Catholicism, most Catholic Albanians converted in the 17th century, while Orthodox Albanians followed suit mainly in the following century.

Since the Albanians were seen as strategically important, they made up a significant proportion of the Ottoman military and bureaucracy. Many Muslim Albanians attained important political and military positions and culturally contributed to the broader Muslim world. Enjoying this privileged position, they held various high administrative positions with over two dozen Albanian Grand Viziers. Others included members of the prominent Köprülü family, Zagan Pasha, Muhammad Ali of Egypt and Ali Pasha of Tepelena. Furthermore, two sultans, Bayezid II and Mehmed III, both had mothers of Albanian origin.

Rilindja 

The Albanian Renaissance was a period with its roots in the late 18th century and continuing into the 19th century, during which the Albanian people gathered spiritual and intellectual strength for an independent cultural and political life within an independent nation. Modern Albanian culture flourished too, especially Albanian literature and arts, and was frequently linked to the influences of the Romanticism and Enlightenment principles.

Prior to the rise of nationalism, Albania was under the rule of the Ottoman Empire for almost five centuries, and Ottoman authorities suppressed any expression of national unity or conscience by the Albanian people. Through literature, Albanians started to make a conscious effort to awaken feelings of pride and unity among their people that would call to mind the rich history and hopes for a more decent future.

The victory of Russia over the Ottoman Empire following the Russian-Ottoman Wars resulted the execution of the Treaty of San Stefano which overlooked to assign Albanian-populated lands to the Slavic and Greek neighbours. However, the United Kingdom and Austro-Hungarian Empire consequently blocked the arrangement and caused the Treaty of Berlin. From this point, Albanians started to organise themselves with the goal to protect and unite the Albanian-populated lands into a unitary nation, leading to the formation of the League of Prizren.

The league had initially the assistance of the Ottoman authorities whose position was based on the religious solidarity of Muslim people and landlords connected with the Ottoman administration. They favoured and protected the Muslim solidarity and called for defence of Muslim lands simultaneously constituting the reason for titling the league Committee of the Real Muslims.

Approximately 300 Muslims participated in the assembly composed by delegates from Bosnia, the administrator of the Sanjak of Prizren as representatives of the central authorities and no delegates from Vilayet of Scutari. Signed by only 47 Muslim deputies, the league issued the Kararname that contained a proclamation that the people from northern Albania, Epirus and Bosnia and Herzegovina are willing to defend the territorial integrity of the Ottoman Empire by all possible means against the troops of Bulgaria, Serbia and Montenegro.

Ottomans authorities cancelled their assistance when the league, under Abdyl Frashëri, became focused on working towards Albanian autonomy and requested merging four vilayets, including Kosovo, Shkodër, Monastir and Ioannina, into an unified vilayet, the Albanian Vilayet. The league used military force to prevent the annexing areas of Plav and Gusinje assigned to Montenegro. After several successful battles with Montenegrin troops, such as the Battle of Novšiće, the league was forced to retreat from their contested regions. The league was later defeated by the Ottoman army sent by the sultan.

Independence 

Albania declared independence from the Ottoman Empire on 28 November 1912, accompanied with the establishment of the Senate and Government by the Assembly of Vlorë on 4 December 1912. Its sovereignty was recognised by the Conference of London. On 29 July 1913, the Treaty of London delineated the borders of the country and its neighbours, leaving many Albanians outside Albania, predominantly partitioned between Montenegro, Serbia and Greece.

Headquartered in Vlorë, the International Commission of Control was established on 15 October 1913 to take care of the administration of newly established Albania, until its own political institutions were in order. The International Gendarmerie was established as the first law enforcement agency of the Principality of Albania. In November, the first gendarmerie members arrived in the country. Prince of Albania Wilhelm of Wied (Princ Vilhelm Vidi) was selected as the first prince of the principality. On 7 March, he arrived in the provisional capital of Durrës and started to organise his government, appointing Turhan Pasha Përmeti to form the first Albanian cabinet.

In November 1913, the Albanian pro-Ottoman forces had offered the throne of Albania to the Ottoman war Minister of Albanian origin, Ahmed Izzet Pasha. The pro-Ottoman peasants believed that the new regime was a tool of the six Christian Great Powers and local landowners, that owned half of the arable land.

In February 1914, the Autonomous Republic of Northern Epirus was proclaimed in Gjirokastër by the local Greek population against incorporation to Albania. This initiative was short-lived, and in 1921 the southern provinces were incorporated into the Albanian Principality. Meanwhile, the revolt of Albanian peasants against the new Albanian regime erupted under the leadership of the group of Muslim clerics gathered around Essad Pasha Toptani, who proclaimed himself the saviour of Albania and Islam. In order to gain support of the Mirdita Catholic volunteers from the northern part of Albania, Prince Wied appointed their leader, Prênk Bibë Doda, to be the foreign minister of the Principality of Albania. In May and June 1914, the International Gendarmerie was joined by Isa Boletini and his men, mostly from Kosovo, and northern Mirdita Catholics, were defeated by the rebels who captured most of Central Albania by the end of August 1914. The regime of Prince Wied collapsed, and he left the country on 3 September 1914.

First Republic and Kingdom 

Following the end of the government of Fan Noli, the parliament adopted a new constitution and proclaimed the country as a parliamentary republic in which King Zog I of Albania (Ahmet Muhtar Zogu) served as the head of state for a seven-year term. Immediately after, Tirana was endorsed officially as the country's permanent capital.

The politics of Zogu was authoritarian and conservative with the primary aim of the maintenance of stability and order. He was forced to adopt a policy of cooperation with Italy where a pact had been signed between both countries, whereby Italy gained a monopoly on shipping and trade concessions. Italians exercised control over nearly every Albanian official through money and patronage. In 1928, the country was eventually replaced by another monarchy with a strong support by the fascist regime of Italy however, both maintained close relations until the Italian invasion of the country. Zogu remained a conservative but initiated reforms and placed great emphasis on the development of infrastructure.

In an attempt at social modernisation, the custom of adding one's region to one's name was dropped. He also made donations of land to international organisations for the building of schools and hospitals. The armed forces were trained and supervised by instructors from Italy, and as a counterweight, he kept British officers in the Gendarmerie despite strong Italian pressure to remove them.

After being militarily occupied by Italy from 1939 until 1943, the Kingdom of Albania was a protectorate and a dependency of the Kingdom of Italy governed by Victor Emmanuel III and his government. In October 1940, Albania served as a staging ground for an unsuccessful Italian invasion of Greece. A counterattack resulted in a sizeable portion of southern Albania coming under Greek military control until April 1941 when Greece capitulated during the German invasion. In April 1941, territories of Yugoslavia with substantial Albanian population were annexed to Albania inclusively western Macedonia, a strip of eastern Montenegro, the town of Tutin in central Serbia and most of Kosovo.

Germans started to occupy the country in September 1943 and subsequently announced that they would recognise the independence of a neutral Albania and set about organising a new government, military and law enforcement. Balli Kombëtar, which had fought against Italy, formed a neutral government and side by side with the Germans fought against the communist-led National Liberation Movement of Albania.

During the last years of the war, the country fell into a civil war-like state between the communists and nationalists. The communists defeated the last anti-communist forces in the south in 1944. Before the end of November, the main German troops had withdrawn from Tirana, and the communists took control by attacking it. The partisans entirely liberated the country from German occupation on 29 November 1944. A provisional government, which the communists had formed at Berat in October, administered Albania with Enver Hoxha as the head of government.

By the end of the Second World War, the main military and political force of the nation, the Communist party sent forces to northern Albania against the nationalists to eliminate its rivals. They faced open resistance in Nikaj-Mërtur, Dukagjin and Kelmend led by Prek Cali. On 15 January 1945, a clash took place between partisans of the first Brigade and nationalist forces at the Tamara Bridge, resulting in the defeat of the nationalist forces. About 150 Kelmendi people were killed or tortured. This event was the starting point of many other issues which took place during Enver Hoxha's dictatorship. Class struggle was strictly applied, human freedom and human rights were denied. The Kelmend region was almost isolated by both the border and by a lack of roads for another 20 years, the institution of agricultural cooperatives brought about economic decline. Many Kelmendi people fled, and some were executed trying to cross the border.

Communism 

In the aftermath of World War II and the defeat of the Axis Powers, the country became initially a satellite state of the Soviet Union, and Enver Hoxha emerged as the leader of the newly established People's Republic of Albania. Soviet-Albanian relations began to deteriorate after Stalin's death in 1953. At this point, the country started to develop foreign relations with other communist countries, among others with the People's Republic of China.

During this period, the country experienced an increasing industrialisation and urbanisation, a rapid collectivisation and economic growth which led to a higher standard of living. The government called for the development of infrastructure and most notably the introduction of a railway system that completely revamped transportation.

The new land reform laws were passed granting ownership of the land to the workers and peasants who tilled it. Agriculture became cooperative, and production increased significantly, leading to the country becoming agriculturally self-sufficient. In the field of education, illiteracy was eliminated among the country's adult population. The government also oversaw the emancipation of women and the expansion of healthcare and education throughout the country.

The average annual increase in the country's national income was 29% and 56% higher than the world and European average, respectively. The nation incurred large debts initially with Yugoslavia until 1948, then the Soviet Union until 1961 and China from the middle of the 1950s. The constitution of the communist regime did not allow taxes on individuals, instead, taxes were imposed on cooperatives and other organisations, with much the same effect.

Today a secular state without any official religion, religious freedoms and practises were severely curtailed during the communist era with all forms of worship being outlawed. In 1945, the Agrarian Reform Law meant that large swaths of property owned by religious groups were nationalised, mostly the waqfs along with the estates of mosques, tekkes, monasteries and dioceses. Many believers, along with the ulema and many priests, were arrested and executed. In 1949, a new Decree on Religious Communities required that all their activities be sanctioned by the state alone.

After hundreds of mosques and dozens of Islamic libraries containing priceless manuscripts were destroyed, Hoxha proclaimed Albania the world's first atheist state in 1967. The churches had not been spared either and many were converted into cultural centres for young people. A 1967 law banned all fascist, religious, and antisocialist activity and propaganda. Preaching religion carried a three to ten-year prison sentence.

Nonetheless, many Albanians continued to practise their beliefs secretly. The anti-religious policy of Hoxha attained its most fundamental legal and political expression a decade later: "The state recognises no religion", states the 1976 constitution, "and supports and carries out atheistic propaganda in order to implant a scientific materialistic world outlook in people".

Fourth Republic 

After forty years of communism and isolation as well as the revolutions of 1989, people, most notably students, became politically active and campaigned against the government that led to the transformation of the existing order. Following the popular support in the first multi-party elections of 1991, the communists retained a stronghold in the parliament until the victory in the general elections of 1992 led by the Democratic Party.

Considerable economic and financial resources were devoted to pyramid schemes that were widely supported by the government. The schemes swept up somewhere between one sixth and one third of the population of the country. Despite the warnings of the International Monetary Fund, Sali Berisha defended the schemes as large investment firms, leading more people to redirect their remittances and sell their homes and cattle for cash to deposit in the schemes.

The schemes began to collapse in late 1996, leading many of the investors to join initially peaceful protests against the government, requesting their money back. The protests turned violent in February 1997 as government forces responded by firing on the demonstrators. In March, the Police and Republican Guard deserted, leaving their armouries open. These were promptly emptied by militias and criminal gangs. The resulting civil war caused a wave of evacuations of foreign nationals and refugees.

The crisis led both Aleksandër Meksi and Sali Berisha to resign from office in the wake of the general election. In April 1997, Operation Alba, a UN peacekeeping force led by Italy, entered the country with two goals exclusively to assist with the evacuation of expatriates and to secure the ground for international organisations. The main international organisation that was involved was the Western European Union's multinational Albanian Police element, which worked with the government to restructure the judicial system and simultaneously the Albanian police.

Contemporary 

Following the disintegration of the communist system, Albania focused on an active process of Westernisation with the goal of accession to the European Union (EU) and the North Atlantic Treaty Organization (NATO). In 2009, the country, together with Croatia, gained active membership in NATO, becoming among the first countries in Southeast Europe to do so. It also applied to join the European Union on 28 April 2009, receiving official candidate status on 24 June 2014.

Edi Rama of the Socialist Party won both the 2013 and 2017 parliamentary elections. As Prime Minister, he implemented numerous reforms focused on modernising the economy, as well as democratising state institutions, including the country's judiciary and law enforcement. Unemployment has been steadily reduced, with Albania achieving the 4th lowest unemployment rate in the Balkans. Rama has also placed gender equality at the centre of his agenda; since 2017 almost 50% of the ministers are female, the largest number of women serving in the country's history.

The tremor was felt in Tirana and in places as far away as Taranto, Italy, and Belgrade, Serbia, while the most affected areas were the coastal city of Durrës and the village of Kodër-Thumanë. Response to the earthquake included substantial humanitarian aid from the Albanian diaspora and several countries around the world.

On 9 March 2020, COVID-19 was confirmed to have spread to Albania. From March to June 2020, the government declared a state of emergency as a measure to limit the rapid spread of the pandemic in the country. The country's COVID-19 vaccination campaign started on 11 January 2021, however, as of 11 August 2021, the total number of vaccines administered so far in Albania amounts to 1,280,239 doses.

During the 2021 parliamentary elections, the ruling Socialist Party led by Edi Rama secured its third consecutive victory, winning nearly half of votes and enough seats in parliament to govern alone. In February 2022, Albania's Constitutional Court overturned parliament's impeachment of President Ilir Meta, opponent of the ruling Socialist Party. In June 2022, the Albanian parliament elected Bajram Begaj, the candidate of the ruling Socialist Party (PS), as the current President of Albania. In January 2023, Albania launched its first two satellites, Albania 1 and Albania 2, into orbit, in what was regarded as a milestone effort in monitoring the country's territory and identifying illegal activities.

Geography 

Its shoreline faces the Adriatic Sea to the northwest and the Ionian Sea to the southwest along the Mediterranean Sea. Albania lies between latitudes 42° and 39° N, and longitudes 21° and 19° E. Its northernmost point is Vërmosh at 42° 35' 34" northern latitude; the southernmost is Konispol at 39° 40' 0" northern latitude; the westernmost point is Sazan at 19° 16' 50" eastern longitude; and the easternmost point is Vërnik at 21° 1' 26" eastern longitude.

For a small country, much of Albania rises into mountains and hills that run in different directions across the length and breadth of its territory. The most extensive mountain ranges are the Albanian Alps in the north, the Korab Mountains in the east, the Pindus Mountains in the southeast, the Ceraunian Mountains in the southwest and the Skanderbeg Mountains in the centre.

Perhaps the most remarkable feature of the country is the presence of numerous important lakes. The Lake of Shkodër is the largest lake in Southern Europe and located in northwest. In the southeast rises the Lake of Ohrid that is one of the oldest continuously existing lakes in the world. Farther south extends the Large and Small Lake of Prespa, which are among the highest positioned lakes in the Balkans. Rivers rise mostly in the east of Albania and discharge into the Adriatic Sea but as well as into the Ionian Sea to a lesser extent. The longest river in the country, measured from its mouth to its source, is the Drin that starts at the confluence of its two headwaters, the Black and White Drin. Of particular concern is the Vjosë, which represents one of the last intact large river systems in Europe.

Climate 

The climate in the country is extremely variable and diverse owing to the differences in latitude, longitude and altitude. Albania experiences predominantly a Mediterranean and continental climate, with four distinct seasons. Defined by the Köppen classification, it accommodates five major climatic types ranging from Mediterranean and subtropical in the western half to oceanic, continental and subarctic in the eastern half of Albania.

The warmest areas of the country are immediately placed along the Adriatic and Ionian Sea Coasts. On the contrary, the coldest areas are positioned within the northern and eastern highlands.

Rainfall naturally varies from season to season and from year to year. The country receives most of the precipitation in winter months and less in summer months. The northwestern and southeastern highlands receive the intenser amount of precipitation, whilst the northeastern and southwestern highlands as well as the Western Lowlands the more limited amount.

The Albanian Alps in the far north of the country are considered to be among the most humid regions of Europe, receiving at least  of rain annually. Snowfall occurs frequently in winter in the highlands of the country, particularly on the mountains in the north and east, including the Albanian Alps and Korab Mountains. Snow also falls on the coastal areas in the southwest almost every winter such as in the Ceraunian Mountains, where it can lie even beyond March.

Biodiversity 

A biodiversity hotspot, Albania possesses an exceptionally rich and contrasting biodiversity on account of its geographical location at the centre of the Mediterranean Sea and the great diversity in its climatic, geological and hydrological conditions. Because of remoteness, the mountains and hills of Albania are endowed with forests, trees and grasses that are essential to the lives for a wide variety of animals, among others for two of the most endangered species of the country, the lynx and brown bear, as well as the wildcat, grey wolf, red fox, golden jackal, Egyptian vulture and golden eagle, the latter constituting the national animal of the country.

The estuaries, wetlands and lakes are extraordinarily important for the greater flamingo, pygmy cormorant and the extremely rare and perhaps the most iconic bird of the country, the dalmatian pelican. Of particular importance are the Mediterranean monk seal, loggerhead sea turtle and green sea turtle that use to nest on the country's coastal waters and shores.

In terms of phytogeography, Albania is part of the Boreal Kingdom and stretches specifically within the Illyrian province of the Circumboreal and Mediterranean Region. Its territory can be subdivided into four terrestrial ecoregions of the Palearctic realm namely within the Illyrian deciduous forests, Balkan mixed forests, Pindus Mountains mixed forests and Dinaric Mountains mixed forests.

Approximately 3,500 different species of plants can be found in Albania which refers principally to a Mediterranean and Eurasian character. The country maintains a vibrant tradition of herbal and medicinal practices. At the minimum 300 plants growing locally are used in the preparation of herbs and medicines. The trees within the forests are primarily made up of fir, oak, beech and pine.

Protected areas 

The protected areas of Albania are areas designated and managed by the Albanian government. There are 15 national parks, 4 ramsar sites, 1 biosphere reserve and 786 other types of conservation reserves. Albania has fifteen officially designated national parks scattered across its territory. Encircled by numerous two-thousanders, Valbonë Valley National Park and Theth National Park cover a combined territory of  within the rugged Albanian Alps in northern Albania. Shebenik-Jabllanicë National Park and Prespa National Park protect the mountainous scenery of eastern Albania as well as the country's sections of the Great and Small Lakes of Prespa. Divjakë-Karavasta National Park extends along the central Albanian Adriatic Sea Coast and possesses one of the largest lagoons in the Mediterranean Sea, the Lagoon of Karavasta.

The Ceraunian Mountains in southern Albania, rising immediately along the Albanian Ionian Sea Coast, characterises the topographical picture of Llogara National Park and continue on the Peninsula of Karaburun within the Karaburun-Sazan Marine Park. Further south sprawls the Butrint National Park on a peninsula that is surrounded by the Lake of Butrint and Channel of Vivari on the eastern half of the Straits of Corfu. Dajti National Park is equipped with a cable car and trails to some spectacular scenery is a popular retreat in the capital, Tirana. In 2023, Vjosa was designated as the first wild river national park in Europe, constituting one of the approximately one-third of the world's major rivers that remain free from human impediments.

Environmental issues 

Environmental issues in Albania include air and water pollution, climate change, waste management, biodiversity loss and nature conservation. Climate change is predicted to have serious effects on the living conditions in Albania. The country is recognised as vulnerable to climate change impacts, ranked 80 among 181 countries in the Notre Dame Global Adaptation Index of 2019. Factors that account for the country's vulnerability to climate change risks include geological and hydrological hazards, including earthquakes, flooding, fires, landslides, torrential rains, river and coastal erosion.

As a party to the Kyoto Protocol and the Paris Agreement, Albania is committed to reduce greenhouse gas emissions by 45% and achieve carbon neutrality by 2050 which, along with national policies, will help to mitigate the impacts of the climate change. The country has a moderate and improving performance in the Environmental Performance Index with an overall ranking of 62 out of 180 countries in 2020.
Albania's ranking has however decreased since its highest placement at position 15 in the Environmental Performance Index of 2012. In 2019, Albania had a Forest Landscape Integrity Index mean score of 6.77 from 10, ranking it 64th globally out of 172 countries.

Governance 

Albania is a parliamentary constitutional republic and sovereign state whose politics operate under a framework laid out in the constitution wherein the president functions as the head of state and the prime minister as the head of government. The sovereignty is vested in the Albanian people and exercised by the Albanian people through their representatives or directly.

The government is based on the separation and balancing of powers among the legislative, judiciary and executive. The legislative power is held by the parliament and is elected every four years by a system of party-list proportional representation by the Albanian people on the basis of free, equal, universal and periodic suffrage by secret ballot.

The civil law, codified and based on the Napoleonic Code, is divided between courts with regular civil and criminal jurisdiction and administrative courts. The judicial power is vested in the supreme court, constitutional court, appeal court and administrative court. Law enforcement in the country is primarily the responsibility of the Albanian Police, the main and largest state law enforcement agency. It carries out nearly all general police duties including criminal investigation, patrol activity, traffic policing and border control.

The executive power is exercised by the president and prime minister whereby the power of the president is very limited. The president is the commander-in-chief of the military and the representative of the unity of the Albanian people. The tenure of the president depends on the confidence of the parliament and is elected for a five-year term by the parliament by a majority of three-fifths of all its members. The prime minister, appointed by the president and approved by the parliament, is authorised to constitute the cabinet. The cabinet is composed primarily of the prime minister inclusively its deputies and ministers.

Foreign relations 

In the time since the end of communism and isolationism, Albania has extended its responsibilities and position in continental and international affairs, developing and establishing friendly relations with other countries around the world. The country's foreign policy priorities are its accession into the European Union (EU), the international recognition of Kosovo and the expulsion of Cham Albanians, as well as helping and protecting the rights of the Albanians in Kosovo, Montenegro, North Macedonia, Greece, Serbia, Italy and the Diaspora.

Albania's admission into the North Atlantic Treaty Organization (NATO) was considered by Albanian politicians to be a significant ambition for the country's foreign policy. The country has been extensively engaged with NATO and has maintained its position as a stability factor and a strong ally of the United States and the European Union (EU) in the region of the Balkans. Albania maintains strong ties with the United States ever after it supported the Albania's independence and democracy. Nowadays, both countries have signed a number of agreements and treaties. In 2007, Albania welcomed George W. Bush who became the first President of the United States ever to visit the country.

Albania and Kosovo are culturally, socially and economically very closely rooted due to the Albanian majority population in Kosovo. In 1998, the country contributed in supporting allied efforts to end the humanitarian tragedy in Kosovo and secure the peace after the NATO bombing of Yugoslavia.

Albania has been an active member of the United Nations since 1955. The country took on membership for the United Nations Economic and Social Council from 2005 to 2007 as well as in 2012. It served as vice president of the ECOSOC in 2006 and 2013. In 2014, it also joined the United Nations Human Rights Council from 2015 to 2017 and was elected vice president in 2015. Albania is a full member of numerous international organisations inclusively the Council of Europe, International Organisation for Migration, World Health Organization, Union for the Mediterranean, Organisation of Islamic Cooperation, Organization for Security and Co-operation in Europe, International Monetary Fund, World Trade Organization and La Francophonie.

Military 

The Albanian Armed Forces consist of Land, Air and Naval Forces and constitute the military and paramilitary forces of the country. They are led by a commander-in-chief under the supervision of the Ministry of Defence and by the President as the supreme commander during wartime however, in times of peace its powers are executed through the Prime Minister and the Defence Minister.

The chief purpose of the armed forces of Albania is the defence of the independence, the sovereignty and the territorial integrity of the country, as well as the participation in humanitarian, combat, non-combat and peace support operations. Military service is voluntary since 2010 with the age of 19 being the legal minimum age for the duty.

Albania has committed to increase the participations in multinational operations. Since the fall of communism, the country has participated in six international missions but participated in only one United Nations mission in Georgia, where it sent 3 military observers. Since February 2008, Albania has participated officially in NATO's Operation Active Endeavor in the Mediterranean Sea. It was invited to join NATO on 3 April 2008, and it became a full member on 2 April 2009.

Albania reduced the number of active troops from 65,000 in 1988 to 14,500 in 2009. The military now consists mainly of a small fleet of aircraft and sea vessels. In the 1990s, the country scrapped enormous amounts of obsolete hardware from China, such as tanks and SAM systems. Increasing the military budget was one of the most important conditions for NATO integration. Military spending has generally been low. As of 1996 military spending was an estimated 1.5% of the country's GDP, only to peak in 2009 at 2% and fall again to 1.5%.

Administrative divisions 

It is informally divided into three regions, the Northern, Central and Southern Regions. Since its Declaration of Independence in 1912, Albania has reformed its internal organization 21 times. Presently, the primary administrative units are the twelve constituent counties, which hold equal status under the law. Counties had previously been used in the 1950s and were recreated on 31 July 2000 to unify the 36 districts of that time. The largest county in Albania by population is Tirana County with over 800,000 people. The smallest county, by population, is Gjirokastër County with over 70,000 people. The largest in the county, by area, is Korçë County encompassing  of the southeast of Albania.

The counties are made up of 61 second-level divisions knowneven in rural areasas municipalities. The municipalities are the first level of local governance, responsible for local needs and law enforcement. They unified and simplified the previous system of urban and rural municipalities or communes in 2015. For smaller issues of local government, the municipalities are organized into 373 administrative units (/). There are also 2980 villages, neighborhoods or wards, and localities previously used as administrative units.

Economy 

The transition from a socialist planned economy to a capitalist mixed economy in Albania has been largely successful. The country has a developing mixed economy classified by the World Bank as an upper-middle income economy. In 2016, it had the 4th lowest unemployment rate in the Balkans with an estimated value of 14.7%. Its largest trading partners are Italy, Greece, China, Spain, Kosovo and the United States. The lek (ALL) is the country's currency and is pegged at approximately 132.51 lek per euro.

The cities of Tirana and Durrës constitute the economic and financial heart of Albania due to their high population, modern infrastructure and strategic geographical location. The country's most important infrastructure facilities take course through both of the cities, connecting the north to the south as well as the west to the east. Among the largest companies are the petroleum Taçi Oil, Albpetrol, ARMO and Kastrati, the mineral AlbChrome, the cement Antea, the investment BALFIN Group and the technology Albtelecom, Vodafone, Telekom Albania and others.

In 2012, Albania's GDP per capita stood at 30% of the European Union average, while GDP (PPP) per capita was 35%. Albania was one of three countries in Europe to record an economic growth in the first quarter of 2010 after the global financial crisis. The International Monetary Fund predicted 2.6% growth for Albania in 2010 and 3.2% in 2011. According to Forbes, the Gross Domestic Product (GDP) was growing at 2.8%. The country had a trade balance of −9.7% and unemployment rate of 14.7%. The Foreign direct investment has increased significantly in recent years as the government has embarked on an ambitious programme to improve the business climate through fiscal and legislative reforms. The economy is expected to expand in the near term, driven by a recovery in consumption and robust investments. Growth is projected to be 3.2% in 2016, 3.5% in 2017, and 3.8% in 2018.

Primary sector 

Agriculture in the country is based on small to medium-sized family-owned dispersed units. It remains a significant sector of the economy of Albania. It employs 41% of the population, and about 24.31% of the land is used for agricultural purposes. One of the earliest farming sites in Europe has been found in the southeast of the country. As part of the pre-accession process of Albania to the European Union, farmers are being aided through IPA funds to improve Albanian agriculture standards.

Albania produces significant amounts of fruits (apples, olives, grapes, oranges, lemons, apricots, peaches, cherries, figs, sour cherries, plums, and strawberries), vegetables (potatoes, tomatoes, maize, onions, and wheat), sugar beets, tobacco, meat, honey, dairy products, traditional medicine and aromatic plants. Further, the country is a worldwide significant producer of salvia, rosemary and yellow gentian. The country's proximity to the Ionian Sea and the Adriatic Sea give the underdeveloped fishing industry great potential. The World Bank and European Community economists report that, Albania's fishing industry has good potential to generate export earnings because prices in the nearby Greek and Italian markets are many times higher than those in the Albanian market. The fish available off the coasts of the country are carp, trout, sea bream, mussels and crustaceans.

Albania has one of Europe's longest histories of viticulture. The today's region was one of the few places where vine was naturally grown during the ice age. The oldest found seeds in the region are 4,000 to 6,000 years old. In 2009, the nation produced an estimated 17,500 tonnes of wine.

Secondary sector 

The secondary sector of Albania have undergone many changes and diversification, since the collapse of the communist regime in the country. It is very diversified, from electronics, manufacturing, textiles, to food, cement, mining, and energy. The Antea Cement plant in Fushë-Krujë is considered one of the largest industrial greenfield investments in the country. Albanian oil and gas is represents of the most promising albeit strictly regulated sectors of its economy. Albania has the second largest oil deposits in the Balkan peninsula after Romania, and the largest oil reserves in Europe. The Albpetrol company is owned by the Albanian state and monitors the state petroleum agreements in the country. The textile industry has seen an extensive expansion by approaching companies from the European Union (EU) in Albania. According to the Institute of Statistics (INSTAT) , the textile production marked an annual growth of 5.3% and an annual turnover of around 1.5 billion euros.

Albania is a significant minerals producer and is ranked among the world's leading chromium producers and exporters. The nation is also a notable producer of copper, nickel and coal. The Batra mine, Bulqizë mine, and Thekna mine are among the most recognised Albanian mines that are still in operation.

Tertiary sector 

The tertiary sector represents the fastest growing sector of the country's economy. 36% of the population work in the service sector which contributes to 65% of the country's GDP. Ever since the end of the 20th century, the banking industry is a major component of the tertiary sector and remains in good conditions overall due to privatisation and the commendable monetary policy.

Previously one of the most isolated and controlled countries in the world, telecommunication industry represents nowadays another major contributor to the sector. It developed largely through privatisation and subsequent investment by both domestic and foreign investors. Eagle, Vodafone and Telekom Albania are the leading telecommunications service providers in the country.

Tourism is recognised as an industry of national importance and has been steadily increasing since the beginnings of the 21st century. It directly accounted for 8.4% of GDP in 2016 though including indirect contributions pushes the proportion to 26%. In the same year, the country received approximately 4.74 million visitors mostly from across Europe and the United States as well.

The increase of foreign visitors has been dramatic. Albania had only 500,000 visitors in 2005, while in 2012 had an estimated 4.2 million, an increase of 740 percent in only 7 years. In 2015, tourism in summer increased by 25 percent in contrast the previous year according to the country's tourism agency. In 2011, Lonely Planet named as a top travel destination, while The New York Times placed Albania as number 4 global touristic destination in 2014.

The bulk of the tourist industry is concentrated along the Adriatic and Ionian Sea in the west of the country. However, the Albanian Riviera in the southwest has the most scenic and pristine beaches, and is often called the pearl of the Albanian coast. The coast has a particular character because it is rich in varieties of virgin beaches, capes, coves, covered bays, lagoons, small gravel beaches, sea caves and many landforms. Some parts of this seaside are very clean ecologically, which represent in this prospective unexplored areas, which are very rare within the Mediterranean. Other attractions include the mountainous areas such as the Albanian Alps, Ceraunian Mountains and Korab Mountains but also the historical cities of Berat, Durrës, Gjirokastër, Sarandë, Shkodër and Korçë.

Transport 

 

Transportation in Albania is managed within the functions of the Ministry of Infrastructure and Energy and entities such as the Albanian Road Authority (ARRSH), responsible for the construction and maintenance of the highways and motorways in Albania, as well as the Albanian Aviation Authority (AAC), with the responsibility of coordinating civil aviation and airports in the country.

The international airport of Tirana is the premier air gateway to the country, and is also the principal hub for Albania's national flag carrier airline, Air Albania. The airport carried more than 3.3 million passengers in 2019 with connections to many destinations in other countries around Europe, Africa and Asia. The country plans to progressively increase the number of airports especially in the south with possible locations in Sarandë, Gjirokastër and Vlorë.

The highways and motorways in Albania are properly maintained and often still under construction and renovation. The Autostrada 1 (A1) represents an integral transportation corridor in Albania and the longest motorway of the country. It will prospectively link Durrës on the Adriatic Sea across Pristina in Kosovo with the Pan-European Corridor X in Serbia. The Autostrada 2 (A2) is part of the Adriatic–Ionian Corridor as well as the Pan-European Corridor VIII and connects Fier with Vlorë. The Autostrada 3 (A3) is currently under construction and will connect, after its completion, Tirana and Elbasan with the Pan-European Corridor VIII. When all three corridors are completed, Albania will have an estimated  of highway linking it with all of its neighbouring countries.

Durrës is the busiest and largest seaport in the country, followed by Vlorë, Shëngjin and Sarandë. , it is as one of the largest passenger ports on the Adriatic Sea with annual passenger volume of approximately 1.5 million. The principal ports serve a system of ferries connecting Albania with numerous islands and coastal cities in Croatia, Greece and Italy.

The rail network is administered by the national railway company Hekurudha Shqiptare which was extensively promoted by the dictator Enver Hoxha. There has been a considerable increase in private car ownership and bus usage while rail use decreased since the end of communism. However, a new railway line from Tirana and its airport to Durrës is currently planned. The specific location of this railway, connecting the most populated urban areas in Albania, makes it an important economic development project.

Infrastructure

Education 

In the country, education is secular, free, compulsory and based on three levels of education segmented in primary, secondary and tertiary education. The academic year is apportioned into two semesters beginning in September or October, and ending in June or July. Albanian serves as the primary language of instruction in all academic institutions across the country. The study of a first foreign language is mandatory and taught most often at elementary and bilingual schools. The languages taught in schools are English, Italian, French and German. The country has a school life expectancy of 16 years and a literacy rate of 98.7%, with 99.2% for males and 98.3% for females.

Compulsory primary education is divided into two levels, elementary and secondary school, from grade one to five and six to nine, respectively. Pupils are required to attend school from the age of six until they turn 16. Upon successful completion of primary education, all pupils are entitled to attend high schools with specialising in any particular field including arts, sports, languages, sciences or technology.

The country's tertiary education, an optional stage of formal learning following secondary education, has undergone a thorough reformation and restructuring in compliance with the principles of the Bologna Process. There is a significant number of private and public institutions of higher education well dispersed in the major cities of Albania. Studies in tertiary education are organised at three successive levels which include the bachelor, master and doctorate.

Health 

The constitution of Albania guarantees equal, free and universal health care for all its citizens. The health care system of the country is currently organised in three levels, among others primary, secondary and tertiary healthcare, and is in a process of modernisation and development. The life expectancy at birth in Albania is at 77.8 years and ranks 37th in the world outperforming several developed countries. The average healthy life expectancy is at 68.8 years and ranks as well 37th in the world. The country's infant mortality rate is estimated at 12 per 1,000 live births in 2015. In 2000, the country had the 55th best healthcare performance in the world, as defined by the World Health Organization.

Cardiovascular disease remain the principal cause of death in the country accounting 52% of total deaths. Accidents, injuries, malignant and respiratory diseases are other primary causes of death. Neuropsychiatric disease has also increased due to recent demographic, social and economic changes in the country.

In 2009, the country had a fruit and vegetable supply of 886 grams per capita per day, the fifth highest supply in Europe. In comparison to other developed and developing countries, Albania has a relatively low rate of obesity probably thanks to the health benefits of the Mediterranean diet. According to World Health Organization data from 2016, 21.7% of adults in the country are clinically overweight, with a Body mass index (BMI) score of 25 or more.

Energy 

Due to its geographical location and natural resources, Albania has a wide variety of energy resources ranging from gas, oil and coal, to wind, solar and water as well as other renewable sources. Currently, the electricity generation sector of Albania is dependent on hydroelectricity simultaneously ranking fifth in the world in percentage terms. The Drin, located in the north, hosts four hydroelectric power stations, including Fierza, Koman, Skavica and Vau i Dejës. Two other power stations, such as the Banjë and Moglicë, are located along the Devoll in the south.

Albania has considerably large deposits of oil. It has the 10th largest oil reserves in Europe and the 58th in the world. The country's main petroleum deposits are located around the Albanian Adriatic Sea Coast and Myzeqe Plain within the Western Lowlands, where the country's largest reserve is located. Patos-Marinza, also located within the area, is the largest onshore oil field in Europe.

After the completion of the Trans Adriatic Pipeline (TAP), Albania will be significantly connected to the planned Southern Gas Corridor, that will transport natural gas from the Caspian Sea through Albania to Europe. In 2009, the company Enel announced plans to build an 800 MW coal-fired power plant in the country, to diversify electricity sources.

The water resources of Albania are particularly abundant in all the regions of the country and comprise lakes, rivers, springs and groundwater aquifers. According to the data presented by the Joint Monitoring Programme for Water Supply and Sanitation (JMP) in 2015, about 93% of the country's total population had access to improved sanitation.

Technology 

After the fall of communism in 1991, human resources in sciences and technology in Albania have drastically decreased. As of various reports, during 1991 to 2005 approximately 50% of the professors and scientists of the universities and science institutions in the country have left Albania. In 2009, the government approved the National Strategy for Science, Technology and Innovation in Albania covering the period 2009 to 2015. It aims to triple public spending on research and development to 0.6% of GDP and augment the share of GDE from foreign sources, including the framework programmes for research of the European Union, to the point where it covers 40% of research spending, among others. Albania was ranked 84th in the Global Innovation Index in 2021.

Telecommunication represents one of the fastest growing and dynamic sectors in Albania. Vodafone Albania, Telekom Albania and Albtelecom are the three large providers of mobile and internet in Albania. As of the Electronic and Postal Communications Authority (AKEP) in 2018, the country had approximately 2.7 million active mobile users with almost 1.8 million active broadband subscribers. Vodafone Albania alone served more than 931,000 mobile users, Telekom Albania had about 605,000 users and Albtelecom had more than 272,000 users.

Demography 

As defined by the Institute of Statistics (INSTAT), the population of Albania was estimated in 2020 at 2,845,955. The country's total fertility rate of 1.51 children born per woman is one of the lowest in the world. Its population density stands at 259 inhabitants per square kilometre. The overall life expectancy at birth is 78.5 years; 75.8 years for males and 81.4 years for females. The country is the 8th most populous country in the Balkans and ranks as the 137th most populous country in the world. The country's population rose steadily from 2.5 million in 1979 until 1989, when it peaked at 3.1 million. It is forecast that the population will continue shrinking for the next decade at least, depending on the actual birth rate and the level of net migration.

The explanation for the recent population decrease is the fall of communism in Albania in the late twentieth century. That period was marked by economic mass emigration from Albania to Greece, Italy and the United States. Four decades of total isolation from the world, combined with its disastrous economic, social and political situation, had caused this exodus. The external migration was prohibited outright during the communist era, while internal migration was quite limited, hence this was a new phenomenon. At least 900,000 people left Albania during this period, with about 600,000 of them settling in Greece. The migration affected the country's internal population distribution. It decreased particularly in the north and south, while it increased in the centre within the cities of Tirana and Durrës.

About 53.4% of the country's population lives in cities. The three largest counties by population account for half of the total population. Almost 30% of the total population is found in Tirana County followed by Fier County with 11% and Durrës County with 10%. Over 1 million people are concentrated in Tirana and Durrës, making it the largest urban area in Albania. Tirana is one of largest cities in the Balkan Peninsula and ranks seventh with a population about 400,000. The second largest city in the country by population is Durrës, with a population of 113,000, followed by Vlorë with a population of 104,513.

Minorities 

Issues of ethnicity are a delicate topic and subject to debate. Contrary to official statistics that show an over 97 per cent Albanian majority in the country, minority groups (such as Greeks, Macedonians, Montenegrins, Roma and Aromanians) have frequently disputed the official numbers, asserting a higher percentage of the country's population. According to the disputed 2011 census, ethnic affiliation was as follows: Albanians 2,312,356 (82.6% of the total), Greeks 24,243 (0.9%), Macedonians 5,512 (0.2%), Montenegrins 366 (0.01%), Aromanians 8,266 (0.30%), Romani 8,301 (0.3%), Balkan Egyptians 3,368 (0.1%), other ethnicities 2,644 (0.1%), no declared ethnicity 390,938 (14.0%), and not relevant 44,144 (1.6%). On the quality of the specific data the Advisory Committee on the Framework Convention for the Protection of National Minorities stated that "the results of the census should be viewed with the utmost caution and calls on the authorities not to rely exclusively on the data on nationality collected during the census in determining its policy on the protection of national minorities.".

Albania recognises nine national or cultural minorities: Aromanian, Greek, Macedonian, Montenegrin, Serb, Roma, Egyptian, Bosnian and Bulgarian peoples. Other Albanian minorities are the Gorani people and Jews. Regarding the Greeks, "it is difficult to know how many Greeks there are in Albania". The estimates vary between 60,000 and 300,000 ethnic Greeks in Albania. According to Ian Jeffries, most of Western sources put the number at around 200,000. The 300,000 mark is supported by Greek government as well. The CIA World Factbook estimates the Greek minority to constitute 0.9% of the total population. The US State Department estimates that Greeks make up 1.17%, and other minorities 0.23%, of the population. The latter questions the validity of the census data about the Greek minority, due to the fact that measurements have been affected by boycott.

Macedonians and some Greek minority groups have sharply criticised Article 20 of the Census law, according to which a $1,000 fine will be imposed on anyone who will declare an ethnicity other than what is stated on his or her birth certificate. This is claimed to be an attempt to intimidate minorities into declaring Albanian ethnicity; according to them the Albanian government has stated that it will jail anyone who does not participate in the census or refuse to declare his or her ethnicity. Genc Pollo, the minister in charge has declared that: "Albanian citizens will be able to freely express their ethnic and religious affiliation and mother tongue. However, they are not forced to answer these sensitive questions". The amendments criticised do not include jailing or forced declaration of ethnicity or religion; only a fine is envisioned which can be overthrown by court.

Greek representatives form part of the Albanian parliament and the government has invited Albanian Greeks to register, as the only way to improve their status. On the other hand, nationalists, various organisations and political parties in Albania have expressed their concern that the census might artificially increase the numbers of the Greek minority, which might be then exploited by Greece to threaten Albania's territorial integrity.

Language 

The official language of the country is Albanian which is spoken by the vast majority of the country's population. Its standard spoken and written form is revised and merged from the two main dialects, Gheg and Tosk, though it is notably based more on the Tosk dialect. The Shkumbin river is the rough dividing line between the two dialects. Also a dialect of Greek that preserves features now lost in standard modern Greek is spoken in areas inhabited by the Greek minority. Other languages spoken by ethnic minorities in Albania include Aromanian, Serbian, Macedonian, Bosnian, Bulgarian, Gorani, and Roma. Macedonian is official in the Pustec Municipality in East Albania. According to the 2011 population census, 2,765,610 or 98.8% of the population declared Albanian as their mother tongue (mother tongue is defined as the first or main language spoken at home during childhood).

In recent years, the shrinking number of pupils in schools dedicated to the Greek minority has caused problems for teachers. The Greek language is spoken by an important percentage in the southern part of the country, due to cultural and economic links with adjacent Greece. In a 2017 study carried out by Instat, the Albanian government statistical agency, 39.9% of the 25–64 years old is able to use at least one foreign language, with English first at 40.0%, followed by Italian with 27.8% and Greek with 22.9%. Among young people aged 25 or less, English, German and Turkish have seen rising interest after 2000. Italian and French have had a stable interest, while Greek has lost much of its previous interest. The trends are linked with cultural and economic factors.

Greek is the second most-spoken language in the country, with 0.5 to 3% of the population speaking it as first language, and with two-thirds of mainly Albanian families having at least one member that speaks Greek, most having learned it in the post communist era (1992–present) due to private schools or migration to Greece. Outside of the small designated "minority area" in the south the teaching of Greek was banned during the communist era. As of 2003 Greek was offered at over 100 private tutoring centres all over Albania and at a private school in Tirana, the first of its kind outside Greece.

Young people have shown a growing interest in the German language in recent years. Some of them go to Germany for studying or various experiences. Albania and Germany have agreements for cooperating in helping young people of the two countries know both cultures better. Due to a sharp rise in economic relations with Turkey, interest in learning Turkish, in particular among young people, has been growing on a yearly basis. Young people, attracted by economic importance of Turkish investments and common values between the two nations, gain from cultural and academic collaboration of universities.

Religion 

As of the 2011 census, there were 1,587,608 (56.7%) Sunni Muslims, 280,921 (10.03%) Roman Catholics, 188,992 (6.75%) Eastern Orthodox, 58,628 (2.09%) Bektashi Muslims, 3,797 (0.14%) Evangelicals, 1,919 (0.07%) other Christians, 602 (0.02%) of other religions and 153,630 (5.49%) believers without denomination in Albania. 69,995 people (2.5%) were irreligious while 386,024 (13.79%) did not declare their religion. Albania is nevertheless ranked among the least religious countries in the world. Religion constitute an important role in the lives of only 39% of the country's population. In another report, 56% considered themselves religious, 30% considered themselves non-religious, while 9% defined themselves as convinced atheists. 80% believed in God and 40% believed in life after death. However, 40% believed in hell, while 42% believed in heaven.

The preliminary results of the 2011 census seemed to give widely different results, with 70% of respondents refusing to declare belief in any of the listed faiths. The Albanian Orthodox Church officially refused to recognize the results, claiming that 24% of the total population adhered to its faith. Some Muslim Community officials expressed unhappiness with the data claiming that many Muslims were not counted and that the number of adherents numbered some 70% of the Albanian population. The Albanian Catholic Bishops Conference also cast doubts on the census, complaining that many of its believers were not contacted. The Muslim Albanians are spread throughout the country. Orthodox and Bektashis are mostly found in the south, whereas Catholics mainly live in the north. In 2008, there were 694 Catholic churches and 425 orthodox churches, 568 mosques and 70 bektashi tekkes in the country.

Albania is a secular and religiously diverse country with no official religion and thus, freedom of religion, belief and conscience are guaranteed under the country's constitution.

During classical times, there are thought to have been about seventy Christian families in Durrës, as early as the time of the Apostles. The Archbishopric of Durrës was purportedly founded by Paul the Apostle, while preaching in Illyria and Epirus. Meanwhile, in medieval times, the Albanian people first appeared within historical records from the Byzantines. At this point, they were mostly Christianised. Islam arrived for the first time in the late 9th century to the region, when Arabs raided parts of the eastern banks of the Adriatic Sea. It later emerged as the majority religion, during centuries of Ottoman rule, though a significant Christian minority remained.

During modern times, the Albanian republican, monarchic and later communist regimes followed a systematic policy of separating religion from official functions and cultural life. The country has never had an official religion either as a republic or as a kingdom. In the 20th century, the clergy of all faiths was weakened under the monarchy and ultimately eradicated during the 1950s and 1960s, under the state policy of obliterating all organised religion from the territories of Albania. The communist regime persecuted and suppressed religious observance and institutions and entirely banned religion. The country was then officially declared to be the world's first atheist state. Religious freedom has returned, however, since the end of communism.

Islam survived communist era persecution and reemerged in the modern era as a practised religion in Albania. Some smaller Christian sects in Albania include Evangelicals and several Protestant communities including Seventh-day Adventist Church, Church of Jesus Christ of Latter-day Saints and Jehovah's Witnesses. The first recorded Protestant of Albania was Said Toptani, who travelled around Europe and returned to Tirana in 1853, where he preached Protestantism. Due to that, he was arrested and imprisoned by the Ottoman authorities in 1864. The first evangelical Protestants appeared in the 19th century and the Evangelical Alliance was founded in 1892. Nowadays, it has 160 member congregations from different Protestant denominations. Following mass emigration to Israel after the fall of communism, there are only 200 Albanian Jews left in the country.

Culture

Symbols 

Albania shares many symbols associated with its history, culture and belief. These include the colours red and black, animals such as the golden eagle living across the country, costumes such as the fustanella, plis and opinga which are worn to special events and celebrations, plants such as the olive and red poppy growing as well across the country.

The flag of Albania is a red flag with a black double-headed eagle positioned in the centre. The red colour used in the flag symbolises the bravery, strength and valour of the Albanian people, while the black colour appears as a symbol of freedom and heroism. The eagle has been used by Albanians since the Middle Ages including the establishment of the Principality of Arbër and by numerous noble ruling families such as the Kastrioti, Muzaka, Thopia and Dukagjini. Gjergj Kastrioti Skënderbeu, who fought and began a rebellion against the Ottoman Empire which halted Ottoman advance into Europe for nearly 25 years, placed the double-headed eagle on his flag and seal.

The country's national motto, Ti Shqipëri, më jep nder, më jep emrin Shqipëtar ("You Albania, you give me honour, you give me the name Albanian"), finds its origins in the Albanian National Awakening. The first to express this motto was Naim Frashëri in his poem Ti Shqipëri më jep nder.

Arts 

The artistic history of Albania has been particularly influenced by a multitude of ancient and medieval people, traditions and religions. It covers a broad spectrum with mediums and disciplines that include painting, pottery, sculpture, ceramics and architecture all of them exemplifying a great variety in style and shape, in different regions and period.

The rise of the Byzantine and Ottoman Empire in the Middle Ages was accompanied by a corresponding growth in Christian and Islamic art in the lands of Albania which are apparent in examples of architecture and mosaics throughout the country. Centuries later, the Albanian Renaissance proved crucial to the emancipation of the modern Albanian culture and saw unprecedented developments in all fields of literature and art whereas artists sought to return to the ideals of Impressionism and Romanticism. However, Onufri, Kolë Idromeno, David Selenica, Kostandin Shpataraku and the Zografi Brothers are the most eminent representatives of Albanian art.

The architecture of Albania reflects the legacy of various civilisations tracing back to the classical antiquity. Major cities in Albania have evolved from within the castle to include dwellings, religious and commercial structures, with constant redesigning of town squares and evolution of building techniques. Nowadays, the cities and towns reflect a whole spectrum of various architectural styles. In the 20th century, many historical as well as sacred buildings bearing the ancient influence were demolished during the communist era.

Ancient architecture is found throughout Albania and most visible in Byllis, Amantia, Phoenice, Apollonia, Butrint, Antigonia, Shkodër and Durrës. Considering the long period of rule of the Byzantine Empire, they introduced castles, citadels, churches and monasteries with spectacular wealth of visible murals and frescos. Perhaps the best known examples can be found in the southern Albanian cities and surroundings of Korçë, Berat, Voskopojë and Gjirokastër. Involving the introduction of Ottoman architecture there was a development of mosques and other Islamic buildings, particularly seen in Berat and Gjirokastër.

A productive period of Historicism, Art Nouveau and Neoclassicism merged into the 19th century, best exemplified in Korçë. The 20th century brought new architectural styles such as the modern Italian style, which is present in Tirana such as the Skanderbeg Square and Ministries. It is also present in Shkodër, Vlorë, Sarandë and Durrës. Moreover, other towns received their present-day Albania-unique appearance through various cultural or economic influences.

Socialist classicism arrived during the communist era in Albania after the Second World War. At this period many socialist-styled complexes, wide roads and factories were constructed, while town squares were redesigned and numerous of historic and important buildings demolished. Notable examples of that style include the Mother Teresa Square, Pyramid of Tirana, Palace of Congresses and so on.

Three Albanian archaeological sites are included in the list of UNESCO World Heritage Sites. These include the ancient remains of Butrint, the medieval Historic Centres of Berat and Gjirokastër, and Natural and Cultural Heritage of the Ohrid region site shared with North Macedonia since 2019. Furthermore, the royal Illyrian tombs, the remains of Apollonia, the ancient Amphitheatre of Durrës and the Fortress of Bashtovë has been included on the tentative list of Albania.

Cuisine 

Throughout the centuries, Albanian cuisine has been widely influenced by Albanian culture, geography and history, and as such, different parts of the country enjoy specific regional cuisines. Cooking traditions especially vary between the north and the south, owing to differing topography and climate that essentially contribute to the excellent growth conditions for a wide array of herbs, fruits, and vegetables.

Albanians produce and use many varieties of fruits such as lemons, oranges, figs, and most notably, olives, which are perhaps the most important element of Albanian cooking. Spices and other herbs such as basil, lavender, mint, oregano, rosemary, and thyme are widely used, as are vegetables such as garlic, onions, peppers, potatoes, tomatoes, as well as legumes of all types.

With a coastline along the Adriatic and Ionian in the Mediterranean Sea, fish, crustaceans, and seafood are a popular and an integral part of the Albanian diet. Otherwise, lamb is the traditional meat for different holidays and religious festivals for both Christians and Muslims, although poultry, beef, and pork are also in plentiful supply.

Tavë kosi ("soured milk casserole") is the national dish of Albania, consisting of lamb and rice baked under a thick, tart veil of yoghurt. Fërgesë is another national dish, made up of peppers, tomatoes, and cottage cheese. Pite is also popular, a baked pastry with a filling of a mixture of spinach and gjizë (curd) or mish (ground meat).

Petulla, a traditional fried dough, is also a popular speciality, and is served with powdered sugar or feta cheese and different sorts of fruit jams. Flia consists of multiple crêpe-like layers brushed with cream and served with sour cream. Krofne, similar to Berliner doughnuts, are filled with jam, or chocolate and often eaten during cold winter months.

Coffee is an integral part of the Albanian lifestyle. The country has more coffee houses per capita than any other country in the world. Tea is also enjoyed both at home or outside at cafés, bars, or restaurants. Çaj Mali (Sideritis tea) is enormously beloved, and a part of the daily routine for most Albanians. It is cultivated across Southern Albania and noted for its medicinal properties. Black tea with a slice of lemon and sugar, milk, or honey is also popular.

Albanian wine is also common throughout the country, and has been cultivated for thousands of years. Albania has a long and ancient history of wine production, and belongs to the Old World of wine producing countries. Its wine is characterised by its sweet taste and traditionally indigenous varieties.

Media 

The freedom of press and speech, and the right to free expression is guaranteed in the constitution of Albania. Albania was ranked 84th on the Press Freedom Index of 2020 compiled by the Reporters Without Borders, with its score steadily declining since 2003. Nevertheless, in the 2020 report of Freedom in the World, the Freedom House classified the freedoms of press and speech in Albania as partly free from political interference and manipulation.

Radio Televizioni Shqiptar (RTSH) is the national broadcaster corporation of Albania operating numerous television and radio stations in the country. The three major private broadcaster corporations are Top Channel, Televizioni Klan and Vizion Plus whose content are distributed throughout Albania and beyond its territory in Kosovo and other Albanian-speaking territories.

Albanian cinema has its roots in the 20th century and developed after the country's declaration of independence. The first movie theater exclusively devoted to showing motion pictures was built in 1912 in Shkodër by an Austrian distribution company with strong efforts by Albanian painter Kolë Idromeno. The opening of other movie theaters followed by 1920 in Shkodër, Berat, Tirana and Vlorë.

During the Peoples Republic of Albania, Albanian cinema developed rapidly with the inauguration of the Kinostudio Shqipëria e Re in Tirana. In 1953, the Albanian-Soviet epic film, the Great Warrior Skanderbeg, was released chronicling the life and fight of the medieval Albanian hero Skanderbeg. It went on to win the international prize at the 1954 Cannes Film Festival. In 2003, the Tirana International Film Festival was established, the largest film festival in the country. Durrës is host to the Durrës International Film Festival, the second largest film festival, taking place at the Durrës Amphitheatre.

Music 

Albanian folk music is a prominent part of the national identity, and continues to play a major part in overall Albanian music. Folk music can be divided into two stylistic groups, mainly the northern Gheg varieties, and southern Lab and Tosk varieties. Northern and southern traditions are contrasted by a rugged tone from the north, and the more relaxed southern form of music.

Many songs concern events from Albanian history and culture, including traditional themes of honour, hospitality, treachery, and revenge. The first compilation of Albanian folk music was made by two Himariot musicians, Neço Muka and Koço Çakali, in Paris, during their work with Albanian soprano Tefta Tashko-Koço. Several gramophone compilations were recorded at the time by the three artists, which eventually led to the recognition of Albanian iso-polyphony as a UNESCO Intangible Cultural Heritage.

Festivali i Këngës is a traditional Albanian song contest organised by the national broadcaster Radio Televizioni Shqiptar (RTSH). The festival is celebrated annually since its inauguration in 1962 and has launched the careers of some of Albania's most successful singers including Vaçe Zela and Parashqevi Simaku. It is significantly a music competition among Albanian performers presenting unreleased songs in premiere, composed by Albanian authors and voted by juries or by public.

Contemporary artists Rita Ora, Bebe Rexha, Era Istrefi, Dua Lipa, Ava Max, Bleona, Elvana Gjata, Ermonela Jaho, and Inva Mula have achieved international recognition for their music, while soprano Ermonela Jaho has been described by some as the "world's most acclaimed soprano". Albanian opera singer Saimir Pirgu was nominated for the 2017 Grammy Award.

Traditional clothing 

Every cultural and geographical region of Albania has its own specific variety of costume that vary in style, material, colour, shape, detail, and form. Presently, national costumes are most often worn during special events and celebrations, mostly at ethnic festivals, religious holidays, weddings, and by performing dance groups. Some elderly people continue to wear traditional clothing in their daily lives. Clothing was traditionally made mainly from local materials such as leather, wool, linen, hemp fibre, and silk; Albanian textiles are still embroidered in elaborate ancient patterns.

Literature 

The Albanian language comprises an independent branch and is a language isolate within the Indo-European family of languages; it is not connected to any other known living language in Europe. Its origin is conclusively unknown, but it is believed to have descended from an ancient Paleo-Balkan language.

The cultural renaissance was first of all expressed through the development of the Albanian language in the area of church texts and publications, mainly of the Catholic region in the northern of Albania, but also of the Orthodox in the south. The Protestant reforms invigorated hopes for the development of the local language and literary tradition, when cleric Gjon Buzuku translated the Catholic liturgy into Albanian, trying to do for Albanian what Martin Luther had done for German. Meshari (The Missal) written by Gjon Buzuku was published in 1555 and is considered one of the first literary work of written Albanian during the Middle Ages. The refined level of the language and the stabilised orthography must be the result of an earlier tradition of written Albanian, a tradition that is not well understood. However, there is some fragmented evidence, pre-dating Buzuku, which indicates that Albanian was written from at least the 14th century.
The earliest evidence dates from 1332 AD with a Latin report from the French Dominican Guillelmus Adae, Archbishop of Antivari, who wrote that Albanians used Latin letters in their books although their language was quite different from Latin. Other significant examples include: a baptism formula (Unte paghesont premenit Atit et Birit et spertit senit) from 1462, written in Albanian within a Latin text by the Bishop of Durrës, Pal Engjëlli; a glossary of Albanian words of 1497 by Arnold von Harff, a German who had travelled through Albania, and a 15th-century fragment of the Bible from the Gospel of Matthew, also in Albanian, but written in Greek letters.

Albanian writings from these centuries must not have been religious texts only, but historical chronicles too. They are mentioned by the humanist Marin Barleti, who in his book Siege of Shkodër (Rrethimi i Shkodrës) from 1504, confirms that he leafed through such chronicles written in the language of the people (in vernacula lingua) as well as his famous biography of Skanderbeg Historia de vita et gestis Scanderbegi Epirotarum principis (History of Skanderbeg) from 1508. The History of Skanderbeg is still the foundation of Skanderbeg studies and is considered an Albanian cultural treasure, vital to the formation of Albanian national self-consciousness.

During the 16th and the 17th centuries, the catechism (E mbësuame krishterë) (Christian Teachings) from 1592 written by Lekë Matrënga, (Doktrina e krishterë) (The Christian Doctrine) from 1618 and (Rituale romanum) 1621 by Pjetër Budi, the first writer of original Albanian prose and poetry, an apology for George Castriot (1636) by Frang Bardhi, who also published a dictionary and folklore creations, the theological-philosophical treaty Cuneus Prophetarum (The Band of Prophets) (1685) by Pjetër Bogdani, the most universal personality of Albanian Middle Ages, were published in Albanian. The most famous Albanian writer in the 20th and 21st century is probably Ismail Kadare. He has been mentioned as a possible recipient of the Nobel Prize in Literature several times.

Sports 

Albania participated at the Olympic Games in 1972 for the first time. The country made their Winter Olympic Games debut in 2006. Albania missed the next four games, two of them due to the 1980 and 1984 boycotts, but returned for the 1992 games in Barcelona. Since then, Albania have participated in all games. Albania normally competes in events that include swimming, athletics, weightlifting, shooting and wrestling. The country have been represented by the National Olympic Committee of Albania since 1972. The nation has participated at the Mediterranean Games since the games of 1987 in Syria. The Albanian athletes have won a total of 43 (8 gold, 17 silver and 18 bronze) medals from 1987 to 2013.

Popular sports in Albania include football, weightlifting, basketball, volleyball, tennis, swimming, rugby union and gymnastics. Football is by far the most popular sport in Albania. It is governed by the Football Association of Albania (F.SH.F.), which was created in 1930 and has membership in FIFA and UEFA. Football arrived in Albania early in the 20th century when the inhabitants of the northern city of Shkodër were surprised to see a strange game being played by students at a Christian mission.

The Albania national football team, ranking 51st in the World in 2017 (highest 22nd on 22 August 2015) have won the 1946 Balkan Cup and the Malta Rothmans International Tournament 2000, but had never participated in any major UEFA or FIFA tournament, until UEFA Euro 2016, Albania's first ever appearance at the continental tournament and at a major men's football tournament. Albania scored their first ever goal in a major tournament and secured their first ever win in European Championship when they beat Romania by 1–0 in a UEFA Euro 2016 match on 19 June 2016. The most successful football clubs in the country are Skënderbeu, KF Tirana, Dinamo Tirana, Partizani and Vllaznia.

Weightlifting is one of the most successful individual sport for the Albanians, with the national team winning medals at the European Weightlifting Championships and the rest international competitions. Albanian weightlifters have won a total of 16 medals at the European Championships with 1 of them being gold, 7 silver and 8 bronze. In the World Weightlifting Championships, the Albanian weightlifting team has won in 1972 a gold in 2002 a silver and in 2011 a bronze medal.

Diaspora 

Historically, the Albanian people have established several communities in many regions throughout Southern Europe. The Albanian diaspora has been formed since the late Middle Ages, when they emigrated to places such as Italy, especially in Sicily and Calabria, and Greece to escape either various socio-political difficulties or the Ottoman conquest of Albania. Following the fall of communism, large numbers of Albanians have migrated to countries such as Australia, Canada, France, Germany, Greece, Italy, Scandinavia, Switzerland, the United Kingdom and the United States. Albanian minorities are present in the neighbouring territories such as the west of North Macedonia, the east of Montenegro, Kosovo in its entirety and southern Serbia. In Kosovo, Albanians make up the largest ethnic group in the country. Altogether, the number of ethnic Albanians living abroad is estimated to be higher than the total population inside Albania.

See also 
 Outline of Albania
 Bibliography of Albania
 Crime in Albania

Notes

References

Further reading 

 History of the Party of Labor of Albania. Tirana: Institute of Marxist–Leninist Studies, 1971. 691 p.

External links 

albania.al
president.al
kryeministria.al
parlament.al 
Albania at The World Factbook by Central Intelligence Agency (CIA)

 
Albanian-speaking countries and territories
Southern European countries
Southeastern European countries
Balkan countries
Member states of NATO
Member states of the Council of Europe
Member states of the Organisation internationale de la Francophonie
Member states of the Organisation of Islamic Cooperation
Member states of the Union for the Mediterranean
Member states of the United Nations
Republics
States and territories established in 1912
Countries in Europe